Quadrille is a dance. 

Quadrille may also refer to:
 Quadrille (card game), a trick-taking card game
 Quadrille (patience), a patience or solitaire game of the 'simple builder' type
 Quadrille (dressage), a choreographed dressage ride
 Quadrille (play), a 1952 play by Noël Coward
 Square tiling in geometry
 Quadrille (1938 film), a French film directed by Sacha Guitry 
 Quadrille (1997 film), a film by Valérie Lemercier

See also
 "Lobster-quadrille", a song in the Lewis Carroll novel Alice in Wonderland
 "Lobster Quadrille", an episode of The Avengers
 Quadrille paper, a type of graph paper